Samjiyŏn Line is the name of a railway line of the Korean State Railway in Ryanggang Province, North Korea, running from Wiyŏn on the Paektusan Ch'ŏngnyŏn Line to Motka. The name is applied both to the original narrow gauge line built in 1948, as well as to the new standard gauge line opened in 2017.

History
To replace the Hyesan to Rimyŏngsu road, which had been built by the Japanese colonial authorities and which by the time of the Liberation of Korea had fallen into a poor state of repair, the Korean State Railway built the  Samjiyŏn Line in 1948. Extensive flooding in 1994 led to the closure of the line.

Conversion to standard gauge
In August 1980, Kim Il-sung ordered the construction of a new east-west transversal trunk line in the extreme north of the country. To accomplish this, railway engineers planned the new line, called the Pukbunaeryuk Line, connecting Manp'o in the west with Hoeryŏng in the east to make use of parts of existing lines where possible to reduce the amount of new construction needed. Construction of this line was to take place in three stages. The first stage, completed in 1988, extended the former Unbong Line to Hyesan, resulting in the current Pukpu Line; the second stage was to have connected Hyesan to Musan on the Musan Line, and the third stage was to have connected Musan to Hoeryŏng on the Hambuk Line.

Construction of the second stage was to have made use of parts of existing lines in several places. From Hyesan to Wiyŏn it was to have shared the existing standard gauge trackage of the Paektusan Ch'ŏngnyŏn Line. The plan also included the conversion to standard gauge of four sections of existing narrow gauge lines: from Wiyŏn to Karim, the existing section of the Samjiyŏn line was to have been regauged; from Karim to Poch'ŏn the existing section of the Poch'ŏn Line was to have been regauged, from Rimyŏngsu to Motka, the remaining portion of the Samjiyŏn Line was to have been converted, and from Hŭngam to Musan the existing section of the narrow gauge Paengmu Line was to have been regauged. Then, new track was to be laid between Poch'ŏn and Rimyŏngsu and between Motka and Hŭngam to connect the regauged sections into a complete line. Although some initial work was started on the second stage, the DPRK's financial crisis of the 1990s led to the project being suspended until 2007.

In 2005, much of the existing infrastructure on the closed narrow gauge line was demolished to make way for new construction, and in early 2007 work began on the new standard gauge line, but due to financial difficulties stopped after only four months; work resumed in November 2008. A ceremony was held on 15 November 2009, but due to a shortage of materials construction was again suspended in August of the same year.

Work resumed once again on 25 May 2015, and another groundbreaking ceremony was held on 4 June of that year. In comparison, domestic rail from the Hwanghae Iron & Steel Complex is supplied in  sections made up of three  sections joined together by welding.

Finally, on 5 April 2017 the first runs were made along the line using two diesel locomotives.

Per the original Pukbunaeryuk Line construction plans, construction is to continue from Motka to Musan, but this is not currently being pursued.

Services
Prior to its closure, many passenger and freight trains ran on the Samjiyŏn Line; in addition to being the main means of transport for local inhabitants, many travellers from around the country used the line to visit the Samjiyŏn Revolutionary Site.

Route

A yellow background in the "Distance" box indicates that section of the line is not electrified; a pink background indicates that section is  narrow gauge; an orange background indicates that section is non-electrified narrow gauge.

Former narrow gauge line

New standard gauge line

References

Railway lines in North Korea
2 ft 6 in gauge railways in North Korea
Standard gauge railways in North Korea